Ouaga FM is a radio station in Burkina Faso. It is transmitted in the French language on 105.2 MHz FM in the capital town Ouagadougou and in Bobo-Dioulasso, the second city, on 101.1 MHz.

See also
 Media of Burkina Faso

External links

Radio stations in Burkina Faso